Lavinia Haitope (born 3 March 1990) is a Namibian long distance runner. She competed in the women's marathon at the 2017 World Championships in Athletics.

In 2018, she competed in the women's marathon at the 2018 Commonwealth Games held in Gold Coast, Australia. She finished in 7th place. In 2019, she competed in the senior women's race at the 2019 IAAF World Cross Country Championships held in Aarhus, Denmark. She finished in 52nd place. In 2019, she also represented Namibia at the 2019 African Beach Games held in Sal, Cape Verde and she won the silver medal in the women's half marathon.

References

External links

1990 births
Living people
Namibian female long-distance runners
Namibian female marathon runners
Namibian female cross country runners
World Athletics Championships athletes for Namibia
Place of birth missing (living people)
Athletes (track and field) at the 2018 Commonwealth Games
Commonwealth Games competitors for Namibia
Athletes (track and field) at the 2019 African Games
African Games competitors for Namibia
20th-century Namibian women
21st-century Namibian women